Bryce Building is located on 909 Throckmorton Street in Fort Worth, Texas. The two-story office building was named after businessman and former mayor William Bryce. The building was designed in the Classical Revival style.  It was constructed with brick made by Denton Press Brick Company.  In 1982 a fire caused major damage to the building.  The building currently houses a law firm.

It was added to the National Register on February 23, 1984.

Photo gallery

See also

National Register of Historic Places listings in Tarrant County, Texas
Recorded Texas Historic Landmarks in Tarrant County

References

External links

Architecture in Fort Worth: Bryce Building

National Register of Historic Places in Fort Worth, Texas
Gothic Revival architecture in Texas
Religious buildings and structures completed in 1914
Buildings and structures in Fort Worth, Texas
Recorded Texas Historic Landmarks